is a railway station located in Chūō-ku, Fukuoka in Japan. Its station symbol is a Japanese cherry blossom in pink, because many cherry blossom trees are planted near this station.

Lines

Platforms

Vicinity
Fukuoka Family Court
Ōhori Post Office
Konkokyo Branch
Tenrikyo Branch
Ōhori Park
Ōhori Park Noh Theater
Fukuoka Art Museum
Fukuoka Elementary School Attached to Fukuoka University of Education
Fukuoka Junior High School Attached to Fukuoka University of Education
Ōhori Junior High School and High School Attached to  Fukuoka University
Nishi Park (ja)
Fukuoka Castle Ruins (Maizuru Park (ja))
Heiwadai Stadium
Fukuoka Financial Group, Inc.
Fukuoka District Meteorological Observatory
NHK Fukuoka broadcasting station
Japan Post Insurance's Fukuoka Service center

References

Railway stations in Japan opened in 1981
Kūkō Line (Fukuoka City Subway)
Railway stations in Fukuoka Prefecture